Amiopsis is an extinct genus of prehistoric bony fish belonging to the family Amiidae. Fossils are known from the Late Jurassic Solnhofen Limestone, Germany (A. lepidota), the Early Cretaceous Purbeck Group, England (A. damoni), La Pedrera de Rúbies Formation, Spain (A. woodwardi) and Bernnissant Iguanodon locality, Belgium (A. dolloi) and the Late Cretaceous (Cenomanian) of the Balkans (A. prisca type species). The monophyly of the genus is questionable, due to it being based on a single character, "the presence of three or more lateral fossae on each side of most abdominal centra". Remains previously assigned to this genus from the Early Cretaceous Las Hoyas, Spain have been moved into the new genus Hispanamia.

See also

 Prehistoric fish
 List of prehistoric bony fish

References

Prehistoric bony fish genera
Jurassic bony fish
Fossils of Belgium
Fossils of Spain